Elguja Gugushvili (Georgian: ელგუჯა გუგუშვილი) also knowns as Jemal Gugushvili (born 14 April 1946) is a Georgian football manager and former goalkeeper.

As a player, he is known for his performances for the FC Sinatle. In the early 1990s, he headed the Georgian U21 youth football team. In 1996-1997 he headed the national team of Turkmenistan. The next two years he headed the Georgian FC WIT Georgia. He also worked in the coaching staffs of various Georgian clubs.

References

External links 
 Гугушвили Джемал (Элгуджа) Сергеевич : FootballFacts

Soviet footballers
Footballers from Georgia (country)
Football managers from Georgia (country)
1946 births
Living people
Expatriate football managers from Georgia (country)
Association footballers not categorized by position
Expatriate sportspeople from Georgia (country) in Turkmenistan
Expatriate football managers in Turkmenistan
Turkmenistan national football team managers
Expatriate sportspeople from Georgia (country) in Greece